Garelochhead ("Headland of the Short Lake") is a small town on the Gare Loch in Argyll and Bute, Scotland.  It is the nearest town to the HMNB Clyde naval base.

Loch Lomond is a few miles to the east, and Loch Long to the west. To some the scenic beauty of the loch is only slightly marred by the presence of the HMNB Clyde submarine base and the associated 'peace camp'. In addition to the few local shops, pub and church, it has a bowling club and two community buildings – the Gibson Hall and  Centre 81, which is home to Route 81 youth project, gym, café, computer suite and meeting rooms. There is also a gallery featuring work by Scottish artists. 

Garelochhead is served by Garelochhead railway station on the West Highland Line and a local bus service running between Coulport and Helensburgh.

History
Garelochhead, originally in Dunbartonshire, now in Argyll and Bute, developed from the 1820s with the advent of steamer cruising during the Glasgow Fair holiday. Tourism was boosted with the opening of the West Highland Railway line to Fort William in 1894, and in the late 20th century its prosperity was linked to the deepwater oil tanker terminal at Finnart on Loch Long and the Faslane naval base. Garelochhead Forest lies to the south.

In 1854 there was a great dispute that became known as the Battle of Garelochhead fought between the locals, led by Sir James Colquhoun, and the passengers of the steamer Ship "Emperor". The trouble started when Colquhoun did not want trippers on the sabbath day. The battle was eventually won by the passengers, but undeterred Colquhoun took his case to the courts who subsequently banned sailings on Sundays.

Before Faslane naval base was constructed during World War II, Garelochhead was a summer destination for people from Glasgow who would arrive from the Gare Loch and spend time in one of the Garelochhead hotels. Following transport advancements, holidaymakers stopped coming to Garelochhead. Faslane was built after this and extended the town as workers settled in the area.

During the 1990s, two of the town's hotels, The Dahlandui and Garelochhead Hotel, burnt down in fires.

In the last ten years, due to lack of attendance the local Roman Catholic Chapel has closed down with Garelochhead Parish Church of Scotland Kirk in the town holding a combined congregation of both Protestant and Catholic.

The Gibson Hall is commonly used as headquarters for cycle races around the Coulport peninsula, such as the Scottish Cycling national road race that was organised by Lomond Roads Cycling Club..

Garelochhead Training Camp is a military training facility located nearby.

References 

Towns in Argyll and Bute